Shanka is a 1993 Indian Bengali action film directed by Salilmoy Ghosh starring Chiranjeet, Robi Ghosh, Subhendu Chatterjee and Rajeshwari. Chiranjeet essayed an honest cop who tries to rescue his wife who have accidentally committed a murder from both the dark side of the law and an evil criminal. The film has musical score by Shyamal Bandyopadhyay.

Synopsis
Amit Sen is an honest police officer who lives with his wife Seema. Things take a turn in their peaceful life when Seema is forced to kill Changez in self defense but unable to reveal the truth to Amit. However, Changez accidentally drops some diamonds in her house which she is unaware of. Shamsher Singh, Changez's boss, harasses her for those diamonds. In due course, Seema is arrested. The rest of the film deals with the tactics employed by Amit to nab the culprits and rescue his wife from the dark side of the law.

Cast
 Chiranjeet
 Rabi Ghosh
 Subhendu Chatterjee
 Rajeshwari Raychowdhury
 Sunil Mukhopadhyay
 Papiya Adhikari
 Siddharth Ray
 Meghraj

See also
List of Bengali films of 1993
Chotushkone, 2014 Bengali film directed by Srijit Mukherji

References

External links
 

1993 films
Bengali-language Indian films
1990s Bengali-language films